Kovilur is a small Village in Nallampalli Block in Dharmapuri District of Tamil Nadu State, India. It comes under Nallampalli Panchayath. It is located 10 km towards South from District headquarters Dharmapuri. 4 km from Nallampalli.

According to catholic missionaries record this place was called as Bellagoundanahalli and Velliyanpettai, due to temple and church in this village, locals and neighboring villagers start calling this place as Kovilur [Kovil(temple)+Oor(village)].

Education Institutes
 St. Thomas Middle School for Girls, Kovilur
 St. Johns High School, Kovilur

References 

Villages in Dharmapuri district